Ceibo is Spanish for Erythrina crista-galli, a tree of national significance for Argentina and Uruguay.
 Ceibo is also one of South America air forces maneuvers
 Ceibo is the manufacturer of Ceibo Emulators 
 Ceibo is the official name of star HD 63454.